Wager's stream frog (Strongylopus wageri) is a species of frog in the family Pyxicephalidae found in South Africa and possibly Lesotho and Eswatini. Its natural habitats are temperate forest, temperate grassland, and rivers. It is threatened by habitat loss.

References

Strongylopus
Amphibians of South Africa
Amphibians described in 1961
Taxonomy articles created by Polbot